Regina Wasilewska-Kita (born 27 February 1951 in Trakucicha) is a Polish politician. She was elected to Sejm on 25 September 2005, getting 6890 votes in 41 Szczecin district as a candidate from the Samoobrona Rzeczpospolitej Polskiej list.

See also
Members of Polish Sejm 2005-2007

External links
Regina Wasilewska-Kita - parliamentary page - includes declarations of interest, voting record, and transcripts of speeches.

Members of the Polish Sejm 2005–2007
Women members of the Sejm of the Republic of Poland
Self-Defence of the Republic of Poland politicians
1951 births
Living people
21st-century Polish women politicians